Kursi al-I`tiraf  (Chair of Confession) is a 1949 Egyptian crime/drama film. It starred Faten Hamama, Fakher Fakher, Abdel Alim Khattab, and Youssef Wahbi, who also directed the movie and wrote its script. Youssef Wahbi, who had played the role of Cardinal Giovanni, received a golden medal from the Vatican.

Plot 

The film portrays the various lives of members of the Catholic Medici family, which is headed by Cardinal Giovanni. The Cardinal's brother, Guliano, has fallen in love with a young and beautiful lady, Phileberta. Another man, Andrea, a handsome and successful army leader, is also in love with her. He competes with Guliano for her heart.

Andrea plots for a dangerous conspiracy; he kills Phileberta's mother and hides his crime. Guliano is blamed for the murder and is then executed and put to death. Months later, Andrea confesses to the cardinal of his malignant crime. Cardinal Giovanni is devastated from the truth of his brother's death.

Cast 
Youssef Wahbi as Cardinal Giovanni.
Abdel Alim Khattab as Andrea Strotsy.
Faten Hamama as Phileberta.
Fakher Fakher as Guliano.
Negma Ibrahim as Mother of Diovanni.
Seraj Munir as Governor of Rome.

External links 
 Film summary, Faten Hamama's official site. Retrieved on January 1, 2007.
 

1949 films
1940s Arabic-language films
1949 crime drama films
Egyptian crime drama films
Egyptian black-and-white films